is a district located in Shiribeshi Subprefecture, Hokkaido, Japan.

As of 2004, the district has an estimated population of 2,096 and a density of 4.79 persons per km2. The total area is 437.26 km2.

Village
Shimamaki

Districts in Hokkaido